De Collega's (The Colleagues) is a classic Belgian comedy TV series about colleagues working in an office of the Ministry of Finance. It originally aired for three seasons between 9 September 1978 and 21 February 1981 on the BRT. A total of 37 episodes was made. The series was written by Jan Matterne, who also directed the first season. The second and third seasons were directed by Vincent Rouffaer. The series was re-aired numerous times, most recently in October 2008.

In 1988 a feature film was released, De Kollega's Maken de Brug.

In 2018 another film was released, De Collega's 2.0. This film was an updated version of the original TV series with new characters. A handful of the original cast members guest starred.

Characters
Paul Thienpondt (born 10 June 1920), played by Bob Van der Veken
Philemon Persez (born 28 February 1940), played by René Verreth
Mireille Puis (born 26 June 1949), played by Nellie Rosiers
Jenny Vanjes (born 25 December 1923), played by Jenny Tanghe
Bonaventuur Verastenhoven (born 29 August 1936), played by Mandus De Vos
Thierry De Vucht (born 24 November 1950), played by Johny Voners
Jean De Pesser (born 17 July 1940), played by Jaak Van Assche
Gilbert Van Hie (born 26 March 1943), played by Tuur De Weert
Jomme Dockx (born 28 February 1940), played by Manu Verreth
Betty Bossé (born 18 March 1955), played by Tessy Moerenhout
Kris Berlo (born 17 October 1958), played by Agnes De Nul
Karolien Van Kersbeke (born 1 January 1958), played by Nora Tilley
Hilaire Baconfoy (born 11 November 1931), played by Jacky Morel
Arabelle Lucas (born 14 October 1921), played by Jo Crab
Jan Clerckx (born 1 July 1934), played by Loet Hanekroot

Episodes

External links
Official website

Flemish television shows
Belgian television sitcoms
1978 Belgian television series debuts
1970s Belgian television series
1981 Belgian television series endings
1980s Belgian television series
Workplace comedy television series
Television shows adapted into films
Eén original programming